Blaire Pancake is an American beauty pageant titleholder who was named Miss Tennessee 2006.

Biography
Pancake competed and won several beauty pageants as a child.  She is the sister of professional golfer Brooke Pancake.  In 2010, she married Wade Koehl, a former University of Houston star football player.

References 

American beauty pageant winners
Miss America 2007 delegates
Miss Tennessee winners
Living people
Year of birth missing (living people)